Stigmella insignis is a moth of the family Nepticulidae. It is endemic to New Zealand.

Taxonomy
This species was first described by Alfred Philpott in 1927 under the name Nepticula insignis. In 1988 J. S. Dugdale placed this species in the genus Stigmella. This placement was confirmed by Hans Donner and Christopher Wilkinson in 1989. The male holotype specimen is held in the New Zealand Arthropod Collection.

Description

The length of the forewings is about 3.5 mm. Adults have been recorded in March, November and December.

Habitat and hosts
The larvae probably feed on Celmisia spectabilis. They mine the leaves of their host plant.

References

Nepticulidae
Moths of New Zealand
Endemic fauna of New Zealand
Taxa named by Alfred Philpott
Moths described in 1927
Endemic moths of New Zealand